Monika Margeta (born 24 April 1975) is a Swedish pool player. A mainstay of the Women's Euro Tour, she reached the final of an event in 2014. Margeta is a member of the Swedish national pool team.

References

External links

 cuescore profile

1975 births
Living people
Swedish pool players
Female pool players
Place of birth missing (living people)